Vinícius Figueira (born 15 April 1991) is a Brazilian karateka. He won the silver medal in the men's kumite 67 kg event at the 2018 World Karate Championships held in Madrid, Spain.

Career 

In 2014, he won one of the bronze medals in the men's kumite 67 kg event at the World Karate Championships held in Bremen, Germany.

At the 2019 Pan American Games held in Lima, Peru, he won one of the bronze medals in the men's kumite 67 kg event.

In March 2020, he was scheduled to represent Brazil at the 2020 Summer Olympics in Tokyo, Japan in karate. This changed in March 2021 after the World Karate Federation revised the system for Olympic qualification. In June 2021, he failed to qualify at the World Olympic Qualification Tournament held in Paris, France for the 2020 Summer Olympics.

He won the gold medal in the men's kumite 67 kg event at the 2022 World Games held in Birmingham, United States.

Achievements

References

External links 
 

Living people
1991 births
Place of birth missing (living people)
Brazilian male karateka
Pan American Games medalists in karate
Pan American Games bronze medalists for Brazil
Medalists at the 2019 Pan American Games
Karateka at the 2019 Pan American Games
South American Games medalists in karate
South American Games silver medalists for Brazil
Competitors at the 2018 South American Games
World Games medalists in karate
World Games gold medalists
Competitors at the 2022 World Games
21st-century Brazilian people